Linaria bipartita is a species of flowering plant in the plantain family known by the common name clovenlip toadflax. It is native to Morocco, but it can be found elsewhere as an introduced species and it is cultivated as an ornamental plant. It is an annual herb growing 10 to 30 centimeters tall with linear leaves 3 to 5 centimeters in length. The inflorescence is a raceme of flowers occupying the top of the stem. The flower is about 2 centimeters long with five lobes arranged into two lips with a spur at the end. The flower is often reddish purple in color, but flowers of many different colors are bred for the garden. The fruit is a spherical capsule about 2 millimeters wide.

References

External links
Jepson Manual Treatment
Photo gallery

bipartita
Flora of Morocco